Paradise Ranch is a 2011 South Korean television series that aired on SBS. It stars Lee Yeon-hee and Shim Chang-min as a divorced couple who married when they were 19, then meet six years later and rediscover their feelings for each other. It was filmed on location in Jeju and Australia.

Synopsis
Han Dong-joo and Lee Da-ji were childhood friends who fell desperately in love and married at 19 after struggling to get their parents' approval. But they divorced after six months. Six years later, they meet coincidentally at a horse auction in Australia. When Dong-joo, the grandson of a tycoon, goes to Jeju Island to develop a resort, he ends up living with his ex-wife, who is now a horse veterinarian. They discover that their feelings for each other are still very much alive.

Cast
Main characters
Shim Chang-min as Han Dong-joo
Lee Yeon-hee as Lee Da-ji
Joo Sang-wook as Seo Yoon-ho
Yoo Ha-na as Park Jin-young

Supporting characters
Chun Ho-jin as Lee Eok-soo
Im Soo-hyang as Lee Da-eun
Jang Yong as Han Suk-sang
Ahn Suk-hwan as Han Tae-man
Na Young-hee as Lee Bok-shim
Lee Si-eon as Secretary Lee
Park Soo-hyun as Baek In-soo
Lee Doo-il as Shim Soo-bong
Yoon Ye-hee as Kang Yang-ja
Choi Jong-yoon as Bang Jong-dae
Jung Eun-pyo as President Yang
Yoon Ji-min as Ji Mil-hye
Jo Sung-ha as Jin-young's father
Shin Pyo as Ki-tae
Song Yoo-hyun as Yoo Song-yi
Choi Soo-young as Tae-man's secretary (cameo, ep 3)
Jin Tae-hyun (cameo)
Yoon Ye-ri

Music

The show's theme song was composed by Lee Pil-ho and the score was composed by Lee Pil-ho and Park Geun-tae. The lyrics for "Confession" were written by Shim Chang-min and is taken from TVXQ's album, Keep Your Head Down. The song "Journey" was also from the same album. The soundtrack was first released in two parts, Part 1 on 26 January 2011 and Part 2 on 31 January 2011. The full original soundtrack was digitally released on 9 February 2011 and released in stores on 11 February 2011.

Ratings

International broadcast
It aired in Japan on DATV in May 2011, on Fuji TV in November 2011, and on KNTV from 9 to 30 April 2012.

Though the series received low viewership ratings in the six to ten percent range during its domestic run, its DVD ranked high on Japan's Oricon weekly chart upon its release in November 2011. Shim Chang-min did the Japanese dubbing for his character on the DVD.

In Thailand aired on Thairath TV beginning December 15, 2015 on Tuesdays to Fridays at 9:00-10:00 a.m.

References

External links
Paradise Ranch official SBS website 

Seoul Broadcasting System television dramas
2011 South Korean television series debuts
2011 South Korean television series endings
Korean-language television shows
South Korean romance television series
Television series by SM C&C
Television series by Samhwa Networks